Virginia Dreher ( born Jennie Cummings Murphy; 1857/59- November 11, 1898), was an American stage actress of the late Victorian era. She was a leading actress in the Augustin Daly company of the 1880s. 

She was married to physician Paul Dreher and, after his death, to stockbroker and railroad magnate George Postlethwaite. 

After her first husband's death a theater manager in Louisville, Kentucky, hired her to perform despite her lack of experience on stage. Daly heard of her work there and hired her for his company.

She died in Arizona from tuberculosis in 1898.

References

External links
Sarony portrait Virginia Dreher(archived)
Ada Rehan and Virginia Dreher
portrait(AlexanderStreet;North American Theatre Online)(WaybackMachine)
cover of The Illustrated Sporting & Dramatic News Saturday August 23, 1884

1857 births
1898 deaths
Tuberculosis deaths in Arizona
Actresses from Kentucky
19th-century American actresses
American stage actresses
19th-century deaths from tuberculosis